Deli Gerdu-ye Olya (also Romanized as Delī Gerdū-ye ‘Olyā; also known as Delī Gerdū) is a village in Margown Rural District, Margown District, Boyer-Ahmad County, Kohgiluyeh and Boyer-Ahmad Province, Iran. At the 2006 census, its population was 103, in 18 families.

References 

Populated places in Boyer-Ahmad County